Seydiler is a town in the Kastamonu Province in the Black Sea region of Turkey. It is the seat of Seydiler District. Its population is 2,851 (2021).

References

Populated places in Kastamonu Province
Seydiler District
Towns in Turkey